I Have Lost... is the second album released by the gothic metal band Mortal Love on 25 April 2005.

Background 
I Have Lost... continues the trilogy of releases started by the album All the Beauty....

It's the last album with the  guitarist Gabriah (Ørjan Jacobsen). He left the band a few months later the album's release.

The song "Adoration" was made into a single and was released as a music video (the only one of Mortal Love) in a remix version.

A Russian edition of the album (under Art Music Group) includes the four tracks from the EP Adoration as bonus tracks.

Track listing
All tracks composed by Mortal Love.

Personnel

Mortal Love 
 Cat (Catherine Nyland) – Female vocals
 Lev  (Hans Olav Kjeljebakken) – Bass, vocals
 Rain6 (Lars Bæk) – Guitars & Programming
 Damous (Pål Wasa Johansen) – Drums
Gabriah (Ørjan Jacobsen) – Guitar

Session musicians
 Zet (Henning Ramseth) –  Keyboards & Programming, Additional Guitar in "Everything"

Additional notes
Phonographic Copyright - Арт Мюзик Групп
Licensed From – Massacre Records
Recorded At – Space Valley Studio
Mastered At – Famous Kitchen
Engineer – Birger P. M. Kirkevaag, Zet 
Mastered By – Andy Horn 
Photography, Design – www.terminal-0.com
Producer – Zet

References

External links 
Discogs.com
Metallum Archives

2005 albums
Massacre Records albums
Mortal Love albums